The Kokang Self-Administered Zone, as stipulated by the 2008 Constitution of Myanmar, is a self-administered zone in northern Shan State. The zone is intended to be self-administered by the Kokang people. Its official name was announced by decree on 20 August 2010.

Government and politics
The Kokang (Self-Administered Zone) is administered by a Leading Body, which consists of at least ten members and includes Shan State Hluttaw (Assembly) members elected from the Zone and members nominated by the Burmese Armed Forces. The Leading Body performs both executive and legislative functions and is led by a Chairperson. The Leading Body has competence in ten areas of policy, including urban and rural development, road construction and maintenance, and public health.

Administrative divisions
The Kokang Self-Administered Zone consists of two townships:

Both townships are administratively part of Laukkaing District.

See also
 2009 Kokang incident
 2015 Kokang offensive
 Pheung Kya-shin

Further reading
 Topo Map of Kokang Self-Administered Zone - Mimu
 Shan (North) State, Myanmar - Mimu

References

Self-administered zones of Myanmar
Subdivisions of Myanmar
Kokang
zh:缅甸掸邦第一特区